Alpenus investigatorum is a moth of the  family Erebidae. It was described by Ferdinand Karsch in 1898. It is found in Ethiopia, Somalia, Kenya, Uganda, Tanzania, Mozambique, Malawi, Angola and Ghana.

The larvae feed on Begonia, Carica papaya, Commelina, Aster, Bidens pilosa, Cosmos, Dahlia, Galinsoga parviflora, Zinnia, Ipomoea batatas, Brassica oleracea, Ricinus, Zea mays, Gossypium, Morus, Boerhavia, Arachis hypogaea, Russelia juncea and Nicotiana tabacum.

References

Moths described in 1898
Spilosomina
Moths of Sub-Saharan Africa